Willowbrook is a village in DuPage County, Illinois,  United States. Per the 2020 census, the population was 9,236. It is a southwestern suburb of Chicago.

History 
Willowbrook grew from the Ridgemoor subdivision. It was incorporated as a village in 1960

Geography
The Village of Willowbrook is located at  (41.767153, -87.949281).

It is bordered by the suburban villages of Hinsdale, Westmont, Clarendon Hills, Burr Ridge, and Darien, along with unincorporated areas of DuPage County.

Demographics
As of the 2020 census there were 9,236 people, 3,916 households, and 2,337 families residing in the village. The racial makeup of the village was 71.77% White, 4.48% African American, 0.30% Native American, 14.63% Asian, 0.03% Pacific Islander, 2.75% from other races, and 6.03% from two or more races. Hispanic or Latino of any race were 7.94% of the population.

There were 3,916 households, out of which 31.10% had children under the age of 18 living with them, 51.61% were married couples living together, 7.02% had a female householder with no husband present, and 40.32% were non-families. 35.29% of all households were made up of individuals, and 14.89% had someone living alone who was 65 years of age or older. The average household size was 2.82 and the average family size was 2.17.

The village's age distribution consisted of 15.0% under the age of 18, 7.1% from 18 to 24, 24.5% from 25 to 44, 28.9% from 45 to 64, and 24.6% who were 65 years of age or older. The median age was 48.8 years. For every 100 females, there were 81.7 males. For every 100 females age 18 and over, there were 77.5 males.

The median income for a household in the village was $86,364, and the median income for a family was $117,415. Males had a median income of $65,748 versus $45,833 for females. The per capita income for the village was $54,805. About 5.0% of families and 5.4% of the population were below the poverty line, including 4.9% of those under age 18 and 9.3% of those age 65 or over.

Note: the US Census treats Hispanic/Latino as an ethnic category. This table excludes Latinos from the racial categories and assigns them to a separate category. Hispanics/Latinos can be of any race.

High cancer rates
In September 2018, the Illinois Department of Public Health began a cancer incidence study based on the recommendation of the Agency for Toxic Substances and Disease Registry. The Willowbrook area shows a '300 in a million' cancer risk based on the 2014 National Air Toxics Assessment, far higher than neighboring communities with a '40 in a million' cancer incidence. A local facility, Sterigenics International, Inc., uses a 'probable carcinogen' called Ethylene Oxide to sterilize medical equipment. According to the EPA fact sheet, 'Long-term exposure to ethylene oxide can irritate the eyes, skin, nose, throat, and lungs, and harm the brain and nervous system (causing effects such as headaches, memory loss, numbness). Studies show that breathing air containing elevated ethylene oxide levels over many years increases the risk of some types of cancers, including cancers of the white blood cells (such as non-Hodgkin's lymphoma, myeloma and lymphocytic leukemia); and breast cancer in females.' 
On September 30, 2019 Sterigenics announced the closing of the Willowbrook facility eliminating key source of cancer causing chemical.

References

External links
Willowbrook official website

 
Villages in Illinois
Villages in DuPage County, Illinois
Populated places established in 1960
1960 establishments in Illinois